Healthy Appetite with Ellie Krieger is a television series on Food Network airing since 2006 and hosted by Ellie Krieger.

References

External links

2006 American television series debuts
2010s American television series
Food Network original programming
English-language television shows